Volleyball at the 2013 Southeast Asian Games took place at Zayyarthiri Indoor Stadium, Naypyidaw, Myanmar between December 13–21.

Indoor volleyball

Men's tournament

Preliminary round

Group A

|}

|}

Group B

|}

|}

Knockout stage

5th Place

|}

Semifinals

|}

Bronze Medal match 

|}

Gold Medal match 

|}

Final standing

Women's tournament

Preliminary round

|}

|}

Bronze Medal match

Gold Medal match

Final standing

Medal winners

References

2013 Southeast Asian Games events
Volleyball at the Southeast Asian Games
2013 in women's volleyball
South